The 1935 Maryland Terrapins football team was an American football team that represented the University of Maryland in the Southern Conference (SoCon) during the 1935 college football season. In their first season under head coach Jack Faber, the Terrapins compiled a 7–2–2 record (3–1–1 in conference), finished third in the SoCon, and outscored their opponents by a total of 127 to 78.

The team played its home games at the original Byrd Stadium in College Park, Maryland, and at Baltimore Stadium in Baltimore.

Schedule

References

Maryland
Maryland Terrapins football seasons
Maryland Terrapins football